Leon Lamb Morris (15 March 1914 – 24 July 2006) was an Australian New Testament scholar.

Born in Lithgow, New South Wales, Morris was ordained to the Anglican ministry in 1938. He earned Bachelor of Divinity (with first class honors) in 1943 and Master of Theology, both from University of London external system. He later received his PhD at the University of Cambridge in England on the subject which became his first major book, The Apostolic Preaching of the Cross. He served as warden of Tyndale House, Cambridge (1960–64); principal of Ridley College in Melbourne (1964-1979), Australia (where they have named a library in his honour); and Visiting Professor of New Testament at Trinity Evangelical Divinity School.

He published several theological works and commentaries on the Bible, notable among which are The Apostolic Preaching of the Cross, The Atonement: Its Meaning and Significance, New Testament Theology, and The Gospel According to John (part of the New International Commentary on the New Testament series), The Gospel According to Matthew (IVP / Eerdmans, 1992), The Epistle to the Romans (IVP / Eerdmans, 1988), and The Book of Revelation: An Introduction and Commentary (Rev. ed., IVP / Eerdmans, 1987).

In 1974, a festschrift was published in his honour. Reconciliation and Hope: New Testament essays presented to L. L. Morris included contributions from John Painter, E. Earle Ellis, Herman N. Ridderbos, Günther Bornkamm, Ralph P. Martin, James D. G. Dunn, Richard N. Longenecker, D. W. B. Robinson, G. R. Beasley-Murray and George Eldon Ladd.

Selected works

Books

Articles

 covers 1954/55

Bibliography

External links
Tyndale House, Cambridge
"The Dead Sea Scrolls and St. John's Gospel"
Obituary
Obituary in the Sydney Morning Herald
A bibliography of Leon Morris's works 
Ridley Melbourne - Mission & Ministry College

1914 births
2006 deaths
Alumni of University of London Worldwide
Alumni of the University of London
Alumni of the University of Cambridge
Australian Anglican priests
New Testament scholars
Australian Anglican theologians
People from the Central Tablelands
Australian biblical scholars
Bible commentators
Evangelical Anglican biblical scholars
Evangelical Anglican clergy
Evangelical Anglican theologians